Andre "Foxxe" Williams is an American singer, guitarist, songwriter, bandleader, and music producer. He was a long-standing member of the band Parliament-Funkadelic and was known for wearing a wedding dress while performing with them live. Andre Foxxe has also performed and recorded with the likes of Red Hot Chili Peppers, Macy Gray, Tony Allen, and Amp Fiddler among others. Andre Foxxe currently lead the band Andre Foxxe & The Psychedelic Ghetto Pimpz out of Detroit, MI.

Solo Discography

See also

 List of P-Funk members
 List of P-Funk projects
 :Category:P-Funk songs
 Parliament discography
 Funkadelic discography
 P-Funk mythology

External links
 Andre Foxxe Official Page
 Andre Foxxe Page on Facebook
 Profile on George Clinton's official website

References

Living people
American rock musicians
Year of birth missing (living people)